Esquire are an English rock band, formed in 1982, noted for their progressive, art, and symphonic style of rock music.

Overview 
Formed in 1982, Esquire released three studio albums: their self-titled debut album Esquire in 1987, a follow-up album Coming Home in 1997, and almost twenty-years later, No Spare Planet, their last album to date.

Two tracks from Coming Home, "Zone of O" and "Tron Thomi", were included on the compilation album Yes, Friends and Relatives. In 2000, two more tracks from Coming Home, "Coming Home" and "Big Girls Don't Cry", were included on the follow-up compilation album Yes, Friends and Relatives, Volume Two.

The band is headed by Nikki Squire, who, when the band started, was married to Yes bassist Chris Squire. Squire, Yes drummer Alan White, Yes producer (and former singer 1979–80) Trevor Horn and Chris and Nikki's eldest daughter, Carmen Squire, all worked on the band's debut album.

The second album, Coming Home, was largely written by Nikki Squire and Nigel McLaren; it also included Danny Isaacs on guitar and vocals on three tracks ("Coming Home", "Keep On Dreaming", "Glass Houses") and Tony Matteucci on drums and vocals.

Discography

Studio albums 
1987: Esquire 
1997: Coming Home 
2016: No Spare Planet

Compilations  
1998: Yes, Friends and Relatives 
2000: Yes, Friends and Relatives Volume 2
2020: Esquire (Self titled limited edition vinyl)
2020: To The Rescue/ Sunshine (alt mix) (Singles) (Self titled limited edition vinyl)

References

External links
Official site
Esquire on MySpace

English progressive rock groups